Buhler is a city in Reno County, Kansas, United States.  As of the 2020 census, the population of the city was 1,325.

History

The first post office in Buhler was established in 1888.

Buhler was primarily inhabited by Mennonite families that had emigrated from Russia during the 1880s.

In September 2012, the City of Buhler received a letter from the Freedom from Religion Foundation regarding a complaint about perceived constitutual violations about the city seal having a cross in it.  In November 2012, the city stated that every legal opinion it had received indicated the city has no supportable case in the event that it was sued to legally force us to remove the seal and sign.  If the city lost, it would be obligated to pay all the legal fees of the prevailing party.  The city decided to hold a contest in January 2013 to redesign the city seal without specific reference to religion.

Geography
Buhler is located at  (38.138147, -97.772891).

Demographics

2010 census
As of the census of 2010, there were 1,327 people, 483 households, and 361 families residing in the city. The racial makeup of the city was 98.1% White, 0.1% African American, 0.7% Native American, 0.1% Pacific Islander, 0.5% from other races, and 0.6% from two or more races. Hispanic or Latino of any race were 2.4% of the population.

There were 483 households, of which 36.0% had children under the age of 18 living with them, 63.1% were married couples living together, 9.3% had a female householder with no husband present, 2.3% had a male householder with no wife present, and 25.3% were non-families. 23.6% of all households were made up of individuals, and 13% had someone living alone who was 65 years of age or older. The average household size was 2.57 and the average family size was 3.03.

The median age in the city was 41.1 years. 26.8% of residents were under the age of 18; 6.8% were between the ages of 18 and 24; 20.9% were from 25 to 44; 23.3% were from 45 to 64; and 22.2% were 65 years of age or older. The gender makeup of the city was 47.2% male and 52.8% female.

2000 census
As of the census of 2000, there were 1,358 people, 478 households, and 371 families residing in the city. The racial makeup of the city was 98.45% White, 0.15% African American, 0.29% Native American, 0.07% Asian, 0.37% from other races, and 0.66% from two or more races. Hispanic or Latino of any race were 1.18% of the population.

There were 478 households, out of which 38.7% had children under the age of 18 living with them, 70.3% were married couples living together, 5.9% had a female householder with no husband present, and 22.2% were non-families. 20.7% of all households were made up of individuals, and 9.8% had someone living alone who was 65 years of age or older. The average household size was 2.69 and the average family size was 3.11.

In the city, the population was spread out, with 28.6% under the age of 18, 6.3% from 18 to 24, 25.6% from 25 to 44, 18.8% from 45 to 64, and 20.8% who were 65 years of age or older. The median age was 38 years. For every 100 females, there were 86.5 males. For every 100 females age 18 and over, there were 85.5 males.

The median income for a household in the city was $44,107, and the median income for a family was $50,598. Males had a median income of $31,976 versus $20,592 for females. The per capita income for the city was $18,278. About 1.1% of families and 1.4% of the population were below the poverty line, including 1.8% of those under age 18 and 2.3% of those age 65 or over.

Government
The Buhler government consists of a mayor and five council members.  The council meets the last Tuesday of each month at 7 pm.

Education
The community is served by Buhler USD 313 public school district.  The school district administrative office is located in Buhler.  The district has six schools and two are located in Buhler:
 Buhler High School, Grades 9 to 12.
 Buhler Grade School, Grades PreK to 5.

Notable people
 Katharina Schellenberg, Mennonite medical missionary.

See also
 Threshing Stone

References

Further reading

 Hoffnungsau in Kansas; A.J. Dyck; Mennonite Life; October 1949.

External links

 
 Buhler - Directory of Public Officials
 Buhler city map, KDOT

Cities in Kansas
Cities in Reno County, Kansas
1888 establishments in Kansas
Populated places established in 1888